Helvetius is the Roman name for a member of the Gallic tribe known as the Helvetii, or an inhabitant of their territory, Helvetia (now known as Switzerland).  It may also refer to:

 a Roman cognomen, typically borne by those of Helvetian origin
 Helvidius, sometimes written Helvetius, author of a work written prior to 383 against the belief in the perpetual virginity of Mary
 Claude Adrien Helvétius (1715–1771), French philosopher and littérateur
 Anne-Catherine de Ligniville, Madame Helvétius (1722–1800), wife of Claude who maintained a renowned salon in France
 James Francis Helvetius Hobler (1764-1844)
 John Frederick Helvetius (1625–1709), Dutch physician and alchemical writer of German extraction
 a character in The Second Maiden's Tragedy
 6972 Helvetius, a main-belt asteroid, discovered in 1992

See also 
 Helvetia, the national personification of Switzerland